The  is the statistical agency of Japan, subordinate to the Ministry of Internal Affairs and Communications.

See also
 Japan Statistical Society

References

External links
 Statistics Bureau of Japan
 Statistics Bureau of Japan 

Government agencies of Japan
Japan